Nikita Sergeyevich Alekseyev (born 9 January 2002) is a Russian football player. He plays for FC Ural Yekaterinburg.

Club career
He made his debut for FC Ural Yekaterinburg on 31 August 2022 in a Russian Cup game against PFC Sochi. He made his Russian Premier League debut for Ural on 11 September 2022 against FC Torpedo Moscow. He saved a penalty kick and kept a clean sheet in a 2–0 Ural victory.

Career statistics

References

External links
 
 
 
 

2002 births
People from Balakhninsky District
Sportspeople from Nizhny Novgorod Oblast
Living people
Russian footballers
Association football goalkeepers
FC Nosta Novotroitsk players
FC Ural Yekaterinburg players
Russian Second League players
Russian Premier League players